Patricio Gabarrón Gil (born 17 April 1993), known as Patric, is a Spanish professional footballer who plays for Italian club Lazio. Mainly a right-back, he can also operate as a defensive midfielder.

Club career

Barcelona
Born in Mula, Region of Murcia, Patric joined FC Barcelona's youth system at La Masia in 2008, aged 15. Originally a defensive midfielder, he was reconverted into right-back by the B side's coach Eusebio Sacristán, a former Barcelona player.

On 22 September 2012, Patric made his debut with the reserves, coming on as a second-half substitute for Gerard Deulofeu in a 3–0 Segunda División away win against Hércules CF. On 26 November of the following year he first appeared with the first team in competitive games, replacing Carles Puyol in the 2–1 loss at AFC Ajax in the group stage of the UEFA Champions League.

Patric scored his first goal as a professional on 28 February 2015, but in a 2–4 home defeat to RCD Mallorca. The season eventually ended in relegation.

Lazio
On 8 June 2015, Patric signed a four-year deal with Serie A club S.S. Lazio. He made his debut in the competition on 30 August, playing the second half of the 4–0 away loss against A.C. ChievoVerona. 

On 7 July 2020, Patric received a red card for biting U.S. Lecce player Giulio Donati in a 2–1 defeat, and was fined €10,000 and given a four-match ban by the Disciplinary Commission the following day. Nine days later, the ban was reduced to three matches and €20,000 on appeal.

Patric scored his first top-flight goal on 7 May 2022, opening a 2–0 home victory over U.C. Sampdoria.

Career statistics

Club

Honours
Lazio
Coppa Italia: 2018–19
Supercoppa Italiana: 2017, 2019

References

External links

1993 births
Living people
People from Río Mula
Spanish footballers
Footballers from the Region of Murcia
Association football defenders
Association football midfielders
Association football utility players
Segunda División players
FC Barcelona Atlètic players
FC Barcelona players
Serie A players
S.S. Lazio players
Spanish expatriate footballers
Expatriate footballers in Italy
Spanish expatriate sportspeople in Italy